Achwa 3 Hydroelectric Power Station, also Achwa 3, is a proposed  hydroelectric power project in Uganda.

Location

Overview
The power station is one of several mini-hydroelectric power stations planned on the Achwa River in the Northern Region of Uganda. Open bid tenders have been solicited from qualified engineering firms to carry out the civil and electromechanical installation and to "design, manufacture, install and commission turbines and other associated works of the project".

Ownership and funding
Achwa 3 is 99 percent owned by the Africa Renewable Energy Fund (AREF), a US$200 million vehicle created and owned by the African Development Bank to invest in the development stage of renewable energy projects in Sub-Saharan African markets, excluding South Africa. AREF is managed by Berkeley Energy on behalf of the fund owners.

See also
 Achwa 2 Hydroelectric Power Station
List of power stations in Uganda
Gulu District

References

External links
 Website of the Electricity Regulatory Authority

Proposed renewable energy power stations in Uganda
Gulu District
Hydroelectric power stations in Uganda